Margaret Debay Rogers (born April 25, 1994) is an American singer-songwriter and record producer from Easton, Maryland. Her big break came when her song "Alaska" was played to Pharrell Williams during a master class at New York University's Clive Davis Institute of Recorded Music. She was nominated for a Grammy Award for Best New Artist in 2019. She graduated from Harvard Divinity School in May 2022.

Early life and education

Early life (1994–2012)
Maggie Rogers grew up on the Eastern Shore of Maryland along the banks of the Miles River in Easton, Talbot County, Maryland. Her father is a now-retired Ford Motor Company dealer and her mother, a former nurse, is now an end-of-life doula. She began playing harp at age seven and loved the music of Gustav Holst and Antonio Vivaldi. Her mother would play neo-soul artists such as Erykah Badu and Lauryn Hill. By the time she was in middle school, Rogers had added piano and guitar to her repertoire and began songwriting in eighth grade. For high school, she graduated from St. Andrew's School in Middletown, Delaware. At school, she played harp in the orchestra, sang in the choir, joined a jazz band, learned banjo and became interested in folk music, and taught herself how to program. She also spent many summers during her formative years at a rural camp in Maine.

The summer after her junior year in high school, Rogers attended a Berklee College of Music program and won the program's songwriting contest, which spurred her to focus on writing. During her high school senior year, she recorded what became her first album, The Echo (2012). Rogers included her demos as part of her application to New York University's Clive Davis Institute of Recorded Music. She secured admission and started in 2012.

College years and discovery (2012–2016)
At NYU, Rogers considered a career in music journalism, and in her first year, Rogers interned for music journalist Lizzy Goodman for whom she transcribed and edited hundreds of hours of interviews with major musicians and journalists, which would be later compiled into Goodman's 2017 book Meet Me in the Bathroom.

She formed a band called Del Water Gap with a singer-songwriter S. Holden Jaffe. The reason they split was because they both wanted to explore more of their solo work. Their song called "New Song" appears on Notes from the Archive: Recordings 2011–2016 (2020).

Rogers released another folk album, Blood Ballet (2014), during her second year at the school. Folk blog EarToTheGround Music explained that the album "...begs for listeners to confront deep personal emotions."

Rogers studied abroad in France while at NYU and after friends convinced her to go clubbing while they were in Berlin, her eyes opened to a new genre and she discovered a love for dance music. When she returned home, Rogers was ready to make new music and merge her folk style with electronic production.

In 2016, after two years of writer's block, Rogers wrote "Alaska", a song she wrote in fifteen minutes about a National Outdoor Leadership School course. She played the song for Pharrell Williams in a master class he taught at her school, and a video of a visibly moved Williams listening to the song went viral that June, resulting in millions of views as well as hundreds of thousands of plays of The Echo and Blood Ballet.

Rogers graduated from New York University's Clive Davis Institute of Recorded Music in May 2016 with a degree in music engineering and production and English.

Graduate school (2021–present)
In September 2021, it became publicly known that Rogers had started graduate school at Harvard Divinity School. She graduated in May 2022 with a master's degree in religion and public life, writing a thesis which "examined cultural consciousness, the spirituality of public gathering and the ethics of pop power". Her 2022 studio album, Surrender, was a component of the thesis.

Music career
After the Pharrell video went viral, several different record labels tried to sign Rogers. She ended up negotiating a recording contract with Capitol Records where "she licenses her music to them through her own imprint, Debay Sounds." As a result, she has more control over her sound and image than many artists at a similar place in their music careers.

Rogers' EP, Now That the Light Is Fading, was released on February 17, 2017. She released her major-label debut studio album, Heard It in a Past Life, on January 18, 2019. The album debuted at No. 2 on the US Billboard 200.

In April 2019, Rogers covered the Taylor Swift song "Tim McGraw" as a Spotify Single. She told Rolling Stone, "This song so distinctly belongs to one of — I think, personally — the greatest living songwriters."

Rogers made her television debut on The Tonight Show Starring Jimmy Fallon on February 15, 2017, Saturday Night Live debut on November 3, 2018, and Today Show debut on July 12, 2019.

Rogers cites Carrie Brownstein, Patti Smith, Kim Gordon of Sonic Youth, and Björk as her musical inspirations, while prominent singers Brandi Carlile and Sharon Van Etten — whom she calls her "musical big sisters" — have become mentors.

She guested with Dead & Company, a rock band consisting of former Grateful Dead members, performing cover versions of the latter's "Friend of the Devil" and the Band's "The Weight" on November 1, 2019, at Madison Square Garden in New York.

Rogers earned a nomination for Best New Artist at the 62nd Grammy Awards.

Rogers performed during the 2020 Democratic National Convention, appearing remotely from Scarborough, Maine due to the COVID-19 pandemic in the United States. She was introduced by Speaker of the Maine House of Representatives and 2020 US Senate candidate from Maine Sara Gideon.

On November 13, 2020, Rogers collaborated with Phoebe Bridgers on a cover version of the Goo Goo Dolls' 1998 single "Iris", which Bridgers said she would make if Donald Trump lost the 2020 United States elections. The song was released as a one-day exclusive on Bandcamp and was downloaded 28,000 times, with all proceeds going to Fair Fight Action. Despite only being available for purchase for one day, the song debuted at number one on the Digital Song Sales chart and No. 57 on the Billboard Hot 100, making it both artists' first entry on the latter chart. The song also charted in Australia, New Zealand, and Scotland.

On December 18, 2020, Rogers released Notes from the Archive: Recordings 2011–2016 via her label Debay Sounds. The album is a compilation of songs she wrote and recorded in the past ten years of her recording career. Some of the songs are from her first two independently released albums: The Echo (2012) and Blood Ballet (2014). Other songs are from her previously unreleased 2016 rock EP and a band she was previously in with Holden Jaffe, Del Water Gap. The album was released along with a deluxe version in which Rogers provides an auditory commentary talking through each stage of her music career that the songs in that section reflect.

On March 30, 2022, Rogers announced her second studio album, Surrender, which was released on July 29, 2022. It was supported by the singles "That's Where I Am", "Want Want", and "Horses". The album features a couple of contributions from notable singers. The track "Shatter" features Florence Welch of Florence and the Machine providing additional vocals and playing tambourine, and "I've Got a Friend" features Clairo and Claud speaking.

Performances

Tours
Headliner
 Heard It in a Past Life World Tour (2019) (supported by Empress Of, Jacob Banks, Melanie Faye, and Now, Now)
 Included stops at Coachella, Shaky Knees Music Festival, Forecastle Festival, and Newport Folk Festival
 The Feral Joy Tour (2022) (supported by Samia & Del Water Gap)

Opening act
 Haim — Sister Sister Sister Tour (2018)
 Kacey Musgraves — Oh, What a World: Tour II (October 25, 2019)
 Mumford & Sons — Delta Tour (2018)
 Leg 1 in Europe and Leg 2 in North America

Festivals
Rogers has performed at numerous festivals around the United States such as Coachella, Governors Ball, Lollapalooza, SXSW, Boston Calling, Outside Lands, Firefly, and Shaky Knees.

She has also played at festivals internationally, including Glastonbury Festival in Pilton, Somerset, England; Rock Werchter in Werchter, Belgium; Osheaga Festival in Montreal, Canada; Latitude Festival in Henham Park, UK; Citadel Festival in London; Down the Rabbit Hole in Ewijk, Netherlands; and Splendour in the Grass Festival in Byron Bay, New South Wales; and at the Main Square Festival in Arras, France.

Personal life
Rogers has synesthesia, a benign condition where two or more senses are perceived at once. In her case, she is able to perceive colors as a response to hearing music.

Activism and philanthropy
Her song "Give a Little" was penned on the same day the National School Walkout demanded congressional action on gun control. She was inspired by the activism of students across the nation, and wrote "Give a Little" about empathy and unity.

Rogers also supports organizations like the ACLU and Planned Parenthood by donating proceeds from merchandise and shows. In an interview, she said that "Planned Parenthood is something that's really important to me. I am proudly, loudly and distinctly pro-choice. I just don't believe that the government should have a say in what a woman's relationship with her doctor is. But I also just think that I am a woman, and I am an artist, and I'm also a businesswoman, and on stage I'm an athlete. And having access to sexual and reproductive health is key for me running my life. It's important that women all over have access to that, because it also affords them access to opportunities."

Rogers performed at the 2020 Democratic National Convention. She later endorsed Sara Gideon, who introduced her performance, in the 2020 United States Senate election in Maine.

Discography

Studio albums

Independent albums

Compilation albums

Extended plays

Singles

As lead artist

As featured artist

Promotional singles

Other charted songs

Music videos

Notes

Accolades

References

Further reading
 After Wowing Pharrell, Maggie Rogers Delivers Her Pop Thesis — NPR
 Artist Interview: Maggie Rogers — EarToTheGround Music
 First, Maggie Rogers's Music Enchanted Pharrell—Now, the Rest of the World — W Magazine
 NY Magazine article
, Online version is titled "Maggie Rogers, an artist of her time".

External links
 
 
 
 
 
 Rogers' 2011 performance at Berklee of "Anybody," winner of 2011 Berklee Songwriting Contest
 Rogers playing "Alaska" in 2016 for Pharrell Williams at NYU, full 31-minute version of video -- Pharrell Williams Masterclass with Students at NYU Clive Davis Institute -- Rogers starts at 18:12
 Rogers' 2017 NPR Tiny Desk Concert

1994 births
American women pop singers
American women singer-songwriters
American folk musicians
American indie pop musicians
American activists
Record producers from Maryland
Capitol Records artists
Folk musicians from Maryland
Living people
Berklee College of Music alumni
People from Easton, Maryland
Singer-songwriters from Maryland
Tisch School of the Arts alumni
21st-century American women singers
21st-century American singers
American women record producers
Folktronica musicians
Harvard Divinity School alumni